Journey of Souls is the second album by Norwegian symphonic power metal band Keldian, and was released worldwide in May 2008 by American label Perris Records. It was produced, engineered and mixed by Arild Aardalen and mastered by Mika Jussila at Finnvox Studios.

The album continues the band's science-fiction inspired lyrical themes and the melding of 80s era melodic rock with modern power and symphonic metal. However, the tracks "Reaper" and "God of War" show the band stretching their niche in both more melodic and more metallic directions. The album also features the Iron Maiden-sounding epic "Memento Mori".

The lyrics deal with the troubles and possibilities of souls traveling through space and time, which culminates in the closing number "Dreamcatcher", and the vocal line "In my dreams I can shape the future, a journey of souls to the end..."

Track listing
 "The Last Frontier" - 3:25
 "Lords of Polaris" - 5:12
 "Reaper" - 3:34
 "The Ghost of Icarus" - 4:11
 "Memento Mori" - 9:18
 "Vinland" - 5:30
 "The Devil in Me" - 4:28
 "Hyperion" - 4:52
 "God of War" - 4:56
 "Starchildren" - 4:30
 "Dreamcatcher" - 3:40

All songs by Andresen/Aardalen.

Song information 

 Hyperion
Based on Dan Simmons' Hyperion series.

 The Last Frontier
Based on Battlestar Galactica.

 The Ghost of Icarus
Based on Sunshine (2007 film).

 Starchildren
Based on Arthur C. Clarke's Space Odyssey series.

Band
 Christer Andresen - lead vocals, electric & acoustic guitars, bass
 Arild Aardalen - keyboards, additional vocals

Featured guests
 Jørn Holen - drums
 Per Hillestad - drums
 H-man - drums
 Anette Fodnes - vocals
 Maja Svisdahl - vocals
 Gjermund Elgenes - vocals
 Anne Marit Bergheim - vocals and mandolin
 Gunhild Mathea Olaussen - violin
 Asle Tronrud - harding fiddle

References

2008 albums
Keldian albums